The Xinmin–Lubei Expressway, commonly referred to as the Xinlu Expressway is an expressway that connects the cities of Xinmin, Liaoning, China, and Lubei, Jarud Banner, Tongliao, Inner Mongolia. The expressway is a spur of G25 Changchun–Shenzhen Expressway.

The expressway connects the following cities:
 Xinmin, Liaoning
 Zhangwu County, Fuxin, Liaoning
 Horqin District, Tongliao, Inner Mongolia
 Lubei, Jarud Banner, Tongliao, Inner Mongolia

Currently only the section from Xinmin to Zhangwu County is complete.

References

Chinese national-level expressways
Expressways in Liaoning
Expressways in Inner Mongolia